Tyriaeum or Tyriaion, also spelled Tyraion, was a Roman and Byzantine era civitas in the Roman Province of Pisidia, located ten parasangs from Iconium It was mentioned by Xenophon, and Pliny and Strabo tell us it was between Philomelium (Akshehr) and Laodicea Combusta. It is tentatively identified with ruins near modern Teke Kozağaçi (Turkey) on the road from Antalya to Denizli or near modern Ilgın.

History
Cyrus the Younger reviewed his troops for the Cilician queen  at Tyriaeum, Pisidia. The town was taken by Suleiman the Magnificent and Tamerlane. In 1308 during the Crusades there was a massacre of refugees from Ephesus in this town by Sultan Saysan.

Christianity 
The city was the seat of an ancient Bishopric. Bishop Theotececnus cast a vote at the Council of Chalcedon. No longer a residential bishopric, it remains a titular see of the Roman Catholic Church.
Tyriaeum was long mistaken as the site of Thyatira of the Apocalypse.

References

Populated places in Pisidia
Former populated places in Turkey
Roman towns and cities in Turkey
Populated places of the Byzantine Empire
History of Konya Province
Catholic titular sees in Asia